Hudson Yards may refer to:
Hudson Yards (development), a real estate development in the Far West Side of Manhattan, New York
Hudson Yards, Manhattan, the rezoning effort for the surrounding neighborhood
34th Street–Hudson Yards station, a subway station